Cefn Einion is a dispersed hamlet in southwest Shropshire, England. It is located two miles southwest of the village of Colebatch, and lies between the small villages of Bryn and Mainstone.

Cefn Einion in Welsh means Einion's Ridge; the name 'Einion' could refer to any of several Einions in recorded history.

The nearest towns are Clun and Bishop's Castle (both small). The village lies at 280m above sea level.

The minor River Unk runs to the west of the village.

External links

Hamlets in Shropshire